The Italian Amateur Championship is an annual snooker competition played in the Italy and is the highest ranking amateur event in Italy.

The competition was established in 2015 in which Pietro Caperna defeated Gianmarco Tonini 6–4 to become the first champion in the tournaments history. The championship is currently held by Massimiliano Sabetta.

Winners

Stats

Finalists

References

Snooker amateur competitions
Snooker in Italy
Recurring sporting events established in 2015
2015 establishments in Italy